Stefanos Tsitsipas won the title, defeating the defending champion Andrey Rublev in the final.

Seeds

Draw

Draw

Play-offs

References

External links
Official website

2022 in Emirati tennis
World Tennis Championship
Mubadala World Tennis Championship - Men
2022 tennis exhibitions